Lecithocera aulias is a moth in the family Lecithoceridae. It is found in Assam, India.

The wingspan is 13–14 mm. The forewings are whitish-ochreous in males, thinly sprinkled with dark fuscous, the costal edge ochreous-yellow, in females, the forewings are ochreous-yellowish, more strongly sprinkled with fuscous and dark fuscous. The costa is suffused with dark fuscous towards the base. The discal stigmata are black, the second connected with the dorsum by a transverse variable patch of dark fuscous suffusion. The hindwings are light grey.

References

Moths described in 1910
aulias